The Lonely Voyage is an adventure novel by English author John Harris. It is his first novel.

Plot introduction
This novel is about a boy, Jess Ferigo, who winds up on a voyage of poaching along with Pat Fee and Old Boxer. The story is about his journey into manhood.

Publication history
 2002, UK, House of Stratus, Incorporated  , July 2002, Paperback

References

External links 
 Cover image at fantasticfiction

1951 British novels
English adventure novels
British bildungsromans
1951 debut novels
Hurst and Blackett books